Jean Mercier, Latin Joannes Mercerus (Uzès ca. 15101570) was a French Hebraist.

He was a pupil of the less known François Vatable, and succeeded Vatable as professor of Hebrew at the Collège Royal. His students included Philippe du Plessis-Mornay, Zacharius Ursinus, Andrew Melville, and Pierre Martinius who became professor at La Rochelle. Mercier was Lecteur du Roi from 1546 onwards.

He fled to Venice because of his sympathies with Protestantism, but returned to France and died of the plague.

Works
Aramaic grammar Tabulae in grammaticen linguae Chaldaeae (Paris, 1560)
De notis Hebraeorum liber (1582), revised by Jean Cinqarbres
Commentary on Genesis (Geneva, posthumous 1598), published by Théodore de Bèze

Translations
Bishop Jean du Tillet's Italian manuscript of the Hebrew Gospel of Matthew (Paris, 1555)
Translation of Constantine Harmenopoulos Hexabiblos or Procheiron (Lyons, 1556, reprinted in 1580, 1587)
Talmudic selections: Libellus de abbreviaturis Hebraeorum, tam Talmudicorum quam Masoritarum et aliorum rabbinorum (Paris, 1561)
Hebrew Jonah with commentary of David Kimchi Jonas cum commentariis R. David Kimhi (1567)
Translation of Abraham Ibn Ezra's Commentary on the Ten Commandments (Lyons, ca. 1567)
Notes to Santes Pagnini's Oẓar Leshon ha-Kodesh (Lyons, 1575)
Translation of Targum Jonathan on the Prophets

References

Date of birth unknown
Year of birth uncertain
1510s births
1570 deaths
French Hebraists
Translators from Hebrew
16th-century deaths from plague (disease)
Grammarians of Aramaic